The Leybourne Islands are a Baffin Island offshore island group located in the Arctic Archipelago in the territory of Nunavut's Qikiqtaaluk Region. The island group lies in the Labrador Sea at the entrance of Popham Bay, off the east coast of Hall Peninsula.

Archipelagoes of Baffin Island
Uninhabited islands of Qikiqtaaluk Region
Archipelagoes of the Canadian Arctic Archipelago
Islands of the Labrador Sea